Abrak-e Yek (also Romanized as Ābrāk-e Yek; also known as Ābrāk) is a village in Howmeh-ye Sharqi Rural District, in the Central District of Izeh County, Khuzestan Province, Iran. At the 2006 census, its population was 144, in 24 families.

References 

Populated places in Izeh County